Stephen A Shill (born 1957) is a British television and film director, actor, screenwriter and television producer.

Early life
Shill was born in 1957 in Buckinghamshire, England. He attended Keswick Grammar School in Keswick, Cumbria, England in the 1970s.

Career
He studied Fine Art at Leeds University, was a member of Impact Theatre Co-operative, and, after they disbanded, made theatre work under his own name.

After completing the BBC Drama Director's Course he began his television directing career with episodes of EastEnders and Casualty for the BBC. Shill created the idea for Granada TV's Ted and Alice starring Dawn French. 
 
He moved to the United States and worked on many successful shows produced by premium cable network HBO, including The Sopranos, The Wire, Rome, Carnivàle, Deadwood and Big Love.

He directed the pilot episode of Showtime's The Tudors and served as a regular director and executive producer throughout the first season. He has also directed episodes of Showtime's Brotherhood and Dexter. Shill directed all eight episodes of Spike TV's The Kill Point mini-series and also served as an executive producer. Shill directed and co-executive produced the 2008 Knight Rider TV movie that served as a pilot for the 2008 follow-up series.

Shill has also directed numerous episodes of memorable network programs, including three programs of the Law & Order series, Night Stalker, Invasion, Commander in Chief, Dragnet, ER and The West Wing.

Shill joined the HBO western drama Deadwood as a director for the first season in 2004. The series was created by David Milch and focused on a growing town in the American West. Shill directed the episode "Jewel's Boot Is Made for Walking". He returned as a director for the second season in 2005 and also wrote an episode. Shill directed the episode "New Money" and wrote and directed the episode "Something Very Expensive". Shill and the writing staff were nominated for a Writers Guild of America Award for Outstanding Drama Series at the February 2006 ceremony for their work on the second season.

Shill directed the theatrical feature Obsessed starring Idris Elba, Beyoncé Knowles, and Ali Larter. The film opened at number one in the United States of America in April 2009, taking almost $70m at the box office and becoming Screen Gems' second biggest opening weekend in their history.

In 2010, Shill directed the miniseries Ben Hur and the first-season episode "Painkiller" for the legal drama series The Good Wife. That same year, he received an Emmy Award for Outstanding Directing for a Drama Series for Dexter: The Getaway.

Shill had acting roles in the films The Last Temptation of Christ, The Missing Reel, Kinsey and Being Human.

References

External links

Alumni of the University of Leeds
Place of birth missing (living people)
English television directors
Living people
People educated at Keswick School
English male film actors
English male television actors
1957 births